Sandra Myers (born January 9, 1961 in Little River, Kansas) is a retired 400 metres sprinter who represented Spain after switching from the United States. She became US champion at 400 metres hurdles in 1981, but received Spanish nationality in 1987 and competed for Spain since. In 1991 she won a silver medal at the World Indoor Championships and a bronze medal at the World Championships.

Myers attended college at California State University, Northridge

Achievements

1Did not finish in the semifinals

Personal bests 
 100 metres: 11.06 s (1991)
 200 metres: 22.38 s (1990)
 400 metres: 49.67 s (1991)
 Long jump: 6.60 m (1988)

References

External links

1961 births
Living people
Spanish female sprinters
Spanish people of American descent
American emigrants to Spain
Athletes (track and field) at the 1988 Summer Olympics
Athletes (track and field) at the 1996 Summer Olympics
Olympic athletes of Spain
World Athletics Championships medalists
Members of the 4th Assembly of Madrid
Members of the People's Parliamentary Group (Assembly of Madrid)
World Athletics Indoor Championships medalists
Olympic female sprinters